St John's Anglican Church or St. John's Anglican Church may refer to the following Anglican churches:

Australia
St John's Anglican Church, Albany
St John's Anglican Church, Dalby
St John's Anglican Church, Darlinghurst
St John's Anglican Church, Fremantle
St John's Anglican Church, Newcastle
St John's Anglican Church, New Town
St John's Anglican Church, Rockhampton
St John's Anglican Church, South Townsville
St John's Anglican Church, Wentworth

Other countries
 St. John's Shaughnessy, Vancouver, Canada (Anglican Church of Canada)
 St. John's Vancouver, Vancouver, Canada (Anglican Church in North America)
 St John's Anglican Church, Camden, England
 St. John's Church, Brownwood, Texas (Anglican Church in North America)
 St John's Anglican Church, Trentham, New Zealand